Cyclothone livida is a species of ray-finned fish in the genus Cyclothone. It is found in the Eastern Atlantic Ocean.

References

Gonostomatidae
Fish described in 1902